Lady is a compilation of songs from the band Styx's early recordings under the Wooden Nickel Records label.  It is very similar to the contemporary Best of Styx compilation, consisting of the same tracks as that album (albeit in a different sequence) minus the song "Winner Take All", which does not appear on this album.

The album was also issued with different artwork and a new subtitle, Lady: ...Encore Collection.

Styx's second album, Styx II, was also temporarily released under the title "Lady", but that recording differs from this one.

Track listing
"Lady" (Dennis DeYoung) – 2:56
"Best Thing" (James Young, D. DeYoung) – 3:13
"Southern Woman" (J. Young, R. Brandle) – 3:10
"Man of Miracles" (J. Young, D. DeYoung, R. Brandle) – 4:55
"You Need Love" (D. DeYoung) – 3:44
"I'm Gonna Make You Feel It" (E. DeYoung) – 2:23
"What Has Come Between Us" (Mark Gaddis) – 4:53
"Rock & Roll Feeling" (J. Young, John Curulewski) – 3:02
"The Grove of Eglantine" (D. DeYoung) – 5:00
"Witch Wolf" (J. Young, R. Brandle) – 3:57

Personnel
Dennis DeYoung - keyboards, vocals
James Young - guitar, vocals
John Curulewski - guitar, keyboards, vocals
Chuck Panozzo - bass
John Panozzo -  drums

1980 compilation albums
Styx (band) compilation albums